Lake Vanda is a lake in Wright Valley, Victoria Land, Ross Dependency, Antarctica. On its shore, New Zealand maintained Vanda Station from 1968 to 1995. Lake Vanda is a hypersaline lake with a salinity more than ten times that of seawater and more than the salinity of the Dead Sea. Lake Vanda is also meromictic, which means that the deeper waters of the lake don't mix with the shallower waters. It is only one of the many saline lakes in the ice-free valleys of the Transantarctic Mountains. The longest river of Antarctica, Onyx River, flows west, inland, into Lake Vanda. There is a meteorological station at the mouth of the river.

The surface of the ice is not covered with snow and is "deeply rutted with cracks and melt lines". During the colder months, the moat refreezes.

While no species of fish live in Lake Vanda or the Onyx River, microscopic life, such as cyanobacteria algal blooms, have been recorded. Due to the concerns over impact to the natural environment that may occur during research, scientific diving operations are limited to work in the upper layer (above ) and remotely operated underwater vehicle use is not allowed.

Vanda Station

Lake Vanda Station was well known for The Royal Lake Vanda Swim Club. Visitors to Lake Vanda Station could dip into the high salinity waters when the icecap edge melted out during summer to form a 'moat', and receive a Royal Lake Vanda Swim Club shoulder patch. Vanda staff would assist the melt by hacking out a 'pool'. Many dignitaries and politicians were inducted into the club, The dip had to be naked (Rule 1), complete immersion (Rule 4), witnessed by a 'Vandal' (Vanda Station staffer) and with no restrictions on photography (Rule 6) to qualify. Rule 10 allowed a natural figleaf, but it had to be natural and also naturally green without artificial aid.

Vanda Station was removed in 1995 as lake levels rose, and is replaced by a shelter, Lake Vanda Hut, that is periodically staffed by 2-8 stream researchers.

References

External links

The Lakes of the McMurdo Dry Valleys

Lakes of Victoria Land
Meromictic lakes
Saline lakes of Antarctica
Endorheic lakes of Antarctica
McMurdo Dry Valleys